Mahuliena, Golden Maiden is co-production Slovak-German film fairy-tale in motif of Brothers Grimm's fairy-tale, Faithful Jan and Maiden Mahulena. The adventure fairy-tale about the brave prince wandering and his faithful butler Jan.

Cast 
 Vladimír Hajdu .... Ján
 Remi Martin .... Prince
 Lara Naszinsky .... Mahuliena
 Maru Valdivielso .... Woman
 Heinz Moog .... King
 Jiří Krytinář .... Zlatovlad (Golden Ruler?!)
 Ján Kožuch .... Stutterer
 Miroslav Noga .... Bearded Man
 Ján Mildner .... An Old Man
 Vilhelm Perháč .... An Old Man

Creators 
 Architect: Viliam Gruska
 Costume: Josef Jelínek, Peter Koza
 Executive Producer: František Dostál
 Location: Macocha, Orava, High Tatras, Vojka, Borinka, Lelský ostrov
 Premiere: August 1987

External links 
 Mahuliena, Golden Maiden in ČSFD (Czech and Slovak)
 

1987 films
Slovak fantasy films
German fantasy films
Slovak-language films
Films based on Grimms' Fairy Tales
Films based on fairy tales
1980s German films
1987 fantasy films